Via Airlines was a US domestic regional airline offering scheduled service across the United States. The airline originally focused on scheduled Essential Air Service from Raleigh County Memorial Airport in Beckley, West Virginia, Parkersburg/Marietta in Parkersburg, West Virginia to Charlotte Douglas International Airport in Charlotte, North Carolina, but had since withdrawn from servicing any areas and maintained only their charter services. In October 2019, the airline declared bankruptcy and ceased all operations.

History 
Via Airlines was established on March 27, 1997, and operated public and private charter flights for corporations, sports teams, casinos, and air travel functions before expanding to scheduled passenger flight services with ViaAir.

Via Airlines began its EAS scheduled flights in December 2014, with the inaugural flight to Beckley, WV taking place on December 3. Prior to ViaAir beginning flights, air service was operated by United Express. The same day as the inaugural Beckley flight, ViaAir announced it would be operating seasonal unsubsidized nonstop service from Charlotte Douglas International Airport to Northeast Florida Regional Airport in St. Augustine, Florida, with its inaugural flight taking place on December 19, 2014.

After a seasonal trial, an agreement was reached to continue service to St. Augustine from Charlotte and Beckley. In early November 2015, ViaAir announced it would extend its St. Augustine service into 2016.

ViaAir, with flights operated by the Charter Air Transport fleet, offers additional air travel options with its AirCruise and Air Tours products. ViaAir's aviation products began in 2009 with its Air Tours, and introduced AirCruise in 2011. AirCruise introduced a concept similar to naval cruises, but that transports passengers by plane instead of by boat. While naval cruising is limited to ports, AirCruise is able to reach landlocked destinations.

On November 15, 2017, ViaAir announced two new destinations from Austin (Oklahoma City and Tucson), taking its total destinations from Austin up to four. Coinciding with this information was the announcement that "ViaAir plans to base crews and maintenance at the Austin-Bergstrom International Airport, positioning its Austin based operations to expand. We will roll out additional cities throughout next year as we hope to be known as Austin’s hometown airline." On February 9, 2018, Via announced two new destinations from Austin (Little Rock and Tulsa), bringing the total of destinations served from Austin up to six.

On May 23, 2019, ViaAir announced that it was suspending the majority of its commercial operations, citing a pilot shortage, with the only operating flights being between Orlando-Sanford International Airport and Jackson, MS.

On May 26, 2019, Austin Bergstrom International Airport announced that it would stop doing business with the airline after it failed to make payments to the airport and that its last day of service to Austin would be May 30, 2019.

On October 8, 2019, the airline announced it would be filing for Chapter 11 bankruptcy in Florida Middle Bankruptcy Court. The airline has since ceased all operations.
In July 2020, Wexford Capital, a Florida-based investment firm, acquired Via Airlines and announced it will relaunch the Airline with a new name.

Destinations

Former destinations

Fleet 

All regional jet aircraft used for ViaAir public charters are operated by its subsidiary, Via Airlines.

See also 
 List of defunct airlines of the United States

References

External links
 

Defunct airlines of the United States
Defunct companies based in Florida
Airlines based in Florida
Maitland, Florida
Airlines established in 1997
Airlines disestablished in 2019
1997 establishments in Florida
2019 disestablishments in Florida
Companies that filed for Chapter 11 bankruptcy in 2019